CVU may refer to:
Canadian Virtual University
Champlain Valley Union High School
 CVU is the ICAO airline designator for Grand Canyon Airlines, United States
 CVU is the IATA airport code for Corvo Airport, Portugal
 US Navy utility carrier (a type of Aircraft carrier)